The 1922–23 international cricket season was from September 1922 to April 1923.

Season overview

November

MCC in Australia

December

England in South Africa

MCC in New Zealand

References

International cricket competitions by season
1922 in cricket
1923 in cricket